opkg  (open package management) is a lightweight package management system based upon ipkg. It is written in C and resembles Advanced Package Tool (APT)/dpkg in operation. It is intended for use on embedded Linux devices and is used in this capacity in the OpenEmbedded and OpenWrt projects.

Opkg was originally forked from ipkg by the Openmoko project. More recently, development of opkg has moved from its old Google Code repository to Yocto Project where it is actively maintained again.

Opkg packages usually use either .ipk or .opk extension.

References

External links
 

Free package management systems
Free software programmed in C
Linux package management-related software
Linux-only free software